Alfred Hellmuth Andersch (4 February 1914 – 21 February 1980) was a German writer, publisher, and radio editor. The son of a conservative East Prussian army officer, he was born in Munich, Germany and died in Berzona, Ticino, Switzerland. Martin Andersch, his brother, was also a writer.

Life
His parents were Alfred Andersch (1875–1929) and his wife Hedwig, née Watzek (1884–1976). His school master was Joseph Gebhard Himmler, the father of Heinrich Himmler. He wrote about this in The Father of a Murderer.

1914 to 1945
In 1930, after an apprenticeship as a bookseller, Andersch became a youth leader in the Communist Party. As a consequence, he was held for 6 months in the Dachau concentration camp in 1933. He then left the party and entered a depressive phase of "total introversion". It was during this period that he first became engaged in the arts, adopting the stance that became known as innere Emigration ("internal emigration") – despite remaining in Germany, he was spiritually opposed to Hitler's regime.

In 1940, Andersch was conscripted into the Wehrmacht, but deserted at the Arno Line in Italy on 6 June 1944. He was interned at Camp Ruston, Louisiana and other POW camps among German prisoners of war in the United States.  He became the editor of a prisoners' newspaper, Der Ruf (The Call).

A critical review of Andersch's "internal émigré" status, his marriage to a German Jew and subsequent divorce in 1943, as well as of his writing, may be read in W.G. Sebald's "Between the Devil and the Deep Blue Sea" attached to his essay On the Natural History of Destruction.<ref>W. G. Sebald. "Between the Devil and the Deep Blue Sea, in On the Natural History of Destruction, New York: Modern Library, 2004.</ref> Sebald accused Andersch of having presented through literature a version of his life (and of the "internal emigration" more generally) that made it sound more acceptable to a post-Nazi public.

1945 to 1980
Having returned to Germany, he worked from 1945 as an editing assistant for Erich Kästner's Neue Zeitung in Munich. From 1946 to 1947, he worked alongside Hans Werner Richter to publish the monthly literary journal Der Ruf, which was sold in the American occupation zone of Germany. The publication was discontinued following the non-renewal of its license by the U.S military government. Presumably, the discontinuation of "Der Ruf" followed "promptings by the Soviet authorities, provoked by Hans Werner Richter's open letter to the French Stalinist, Marcel Cachin." In the following years, Andersch worked with the literary circle Group 47, members of which included the authors Ingeborg Bachmann, Wolfgang Hildesheimer, Arno Schmidt, Hans Magnus Enzensberger and Helmut Heissenbüttel, among others. 1948 saw the publication of Andersch's essay "Deutsche Literatur in der Entscheidung" (German Literature at the Turning Point), in which he concluded, in the spirit of the American post-war "re-education" programme, that literature would play a decisive role in the moral and intellectual changes in Germany.

Beginning in 1948, Andersch was a leading figure at radio stations in Frankfurt and Hamburg. In 1950, he married the painter Gisela Dichgans. His autobiographical work Die Kirschen der Freiheit (The Cherries of Freedom) was published in 1952, in which Andersch dealt with the experience of his wartime desertion and interpreted it as the "turning point" (Entscheidung) at which he could first feel free. On a similar theme, he published in 1957 perhaps the most significant work of his career, Sansibar oder der letzte Grund (published in English as Flight to Afar). A few of Andersch's books were turned into films.

From 1958, Andersch lived in Berzona in Switzerland, where he became mayor in 1972. After Sansibar followed the novels Die Rote in 1960, Efraim in 1967, and, in 1974, Winterspelt, which is, thematically, very similar to Sansibar, but is more complex in its composition. In 1977, he published the poetry anthology empört euch der himmel ist blau . Alfred Andersch died on 21 February 1980 in Berzona, Ticino. The incomplete story Der Vater eines Mörders (The Father of a Murderer) was published posthumously in the same year.

Themes
Alfred Andersch served as an analyst of contemporary issues for the post-war generation. In his works, he described, above all, outsiders, and dealt with his political and moral experiences. He often raised questions about the free will of the individual as a central theme. In numerous essays, he stated his opinion on literary and cultural issues; he frequently pointed out the importance of Ernst Jünger.

Works

Critical edition
On 21 February 2005, to commemorate the 25th anniversary of Andersch's death, Diogenes Press released a critical edition of his complete works. The ten volumes also include previously unpublished texts that come from his estate.Gesammelte Werke in 10 Bänden in Kassette, 5952 S., Zürich / Schweiz, Diogenes Verlag, Leinen, .

Individual worksDeutsche Literatur in der Entscheidung; essay, 1948Die Kirschen der Freiheit; autobiography, 1952. The Cherries of Freedom: A Report, translated by Michael Hulse (2004)Sansibar oder der letzte Grund  novel, 1957.  Flight to Afar, translated by Michael Bullock (1961). Filmed twice, first as Sansibar (1961), director Rainer Wolffhardt, then as Sansibar oder der letzte Grund (1987), director Bernhard Wicki.Geister und Leute. Zehn Geschichten (1958). The Night of the Giraffe and Other Stories, translated by Christa Armstrong (1964)Die Rote; novel, 1960; New Edition 1972. The Redhead translated by Michael Bullock (1961). Filmed as Redhead (1962).Efraim; novel, 1967Mein Verschwinden in Providence; stories, 1971. My Disappearance in Providence, and other stories, translated by Ralph ManheimWinterspelt; novel, 1974. Winterspelt, translated by Richard and Clara Winston (1978). Filmed as Winterspelt (1979)Das Alfred Andersch Lesebuch; selected works, 1979Der Vater eines Mörders; 1980. The Father of a Murderer, translated by Leila Vennewitz (1994)Arno Schmidt, Der Briefwechsel mit Alfred Andersch; letters, 1985Fahrerflucht; radio play

Bibliography of primary works
Bibliografie des Deutschen Literaturarchivs Marbach am Neckar (German link)

Bibliography of secondary works
Bibliografie der Sekundärliteratur zum Werk von Alfred Andersch von Daniela Unterwieser (German link)
38 Nachweise von Sekundärliteratur zu Alfred Andersch aus der MLA-Bibliography 1981–1998  (German link'')

References

External links

Andersch as an Essayist
Literatur von und über Alfred Andersch
SNM/DLA: Der Nachlaß Alfred Anderschs
http://ondemand-mp3.dradio.de/file/dradio/2005/05/20/dlf_1609.mp3 – Interview with the editor of the 10-volume Complete Works (2005), 19:29 Minutes
Links at fu-berlin
Biographie

1914 births
1980 deaths
Writers from Munich
People from the Kingdom of Bavaria
Communist Party of Germany politicians
Writers from Bavaria
Dachau concentration camp survivors
German military personnel of World War II
20th-century German novelists
German male novelists
German-language poets
German male poets
20th-century German male writers
German prisoners of war in World War II held by the United States